Simon Vincent (fl. 1384–1402), of Tarring Neville and West Dean, Sussex, was an English politician.

Family
His son was the MP, John Vincent.

Career
He was a Member (MP) of the Parliament of England for Chichester in November 1384, September 1388 and 1402.

References

14th-century births
15th-century deaths
English MPs November 1384
English MPs September 1388
People from Lewes District
English MPs 1402
People from West Dean, West Sussex